Hillary Griffiths (1871–1937) was an English footballer who played in the Football League for Wolverhampton Wanderers with whom he played in the 1896 FA Cup Final.

References

1871 births
1937 deaths
English footballers
Association football midfielders
English Football League players
Wolverhampton Wanderers F.C. players
People from Wednesfield
FA Cup Final players